Child development in India is the Indian experience of biological, psychological, and emotional changes which children experience as they grow into adults. Child development has a significant influence on personal health and, at a national level, the health of people in India.

Children constitute a significant part of the national disease burden of India. Environmental health problems such as Pollution-related diseases, challenges with a water supply, and sanitation in India are difficult to fix and greatly affect children. Many children in India miss vaccination and consequently acquire infectious diseases that vaccines could have prevented.

40% of children in India experience malnutrition or stunted growth due to lack of access to healthy meals. India has a success story in the Midday Meal Scheme, which feeds 100 million children daily.

Early childhood development
Early childhood is the period up to the age of six. Other definitions extend ECD to age eight to account for changes that occur during a child's transition into primary level education. Children can develop brain damage in the absence of healthy conditions.

Child development markers
Common markers used by researchers and experts in the statistical examination of childhood development include, age, income, and locality. This show marked differences in the India context.

Age

First 1000 days

The first 1000 days is a concept in child development, that recommends planning to give a child the best possible start in their first 1000 days after birth. The general recommendation for babies is that they should breastfeed soon after birth to get colostrum. Some factors which prevent mothers from giving colostrum to their newborns include maternal health challenges, including the risk of maternal mortality and social taboo.

After a child is born, regular access to primary care from a doctor improves health outcomes. Young children visiting a doctor get vaccinated. Children in families that are much poor are less likely to access the care they need.

Pre-adolescence
Preadolescence is the period where early childhood ends, and puberty begins. Girls at this time need education and preparedness to do menstrual hygiene management. A 2020 study reported that half of the girls in India get their first information about menstruation after their first period. Girls who are prepared for this have better development outcomes.

Trends in child development
Optimal child development starts before conception and is dependent on adequate nutrition for mother and child, protection from threats, provision of learning opportunities, and caregiver interactions that are stimulating, responsive, and emotionally supportive. The first 1000 days are considered crucial because of the adaptability of children's brains during this period and because reversing early deficits becomes more difficult as children grow older.

Optimal development in early childhood can be disrupted by various adversities concerning a child's environments and relationships with caregivers. These adversities vary in intensity and range from violence in the home, neglect, abuse, lack of opportunity for play and cognitive stimulation, and parental ill-health. Exposure to multiple adversities poses a cumulative detrimental burden to a child's wellbeing, especially in low- and middle-income communities.

In 2008, there were an estimated 158 million children under the age of six in India. Generally, these children suffered from poor nutrition and healthcare. Around one in ten Indian children experience diarrhoea and almost one in six experience fever. Half of children younger than three were deprived of full immunisation.

Inequalities in child health and development

Childhood development is considered a key factor in achieving the ambitious global Sustainable Development Goals. 45% of Indian under-threes experience stunting, a measure of chronic malnutrition.

Prevalent factors in child underdevelopment

Nutrition

A 2017 study reported that 57% of newborns in their first 1000 days in India transition on time from breastfeeding to nutritious solid food; 48% get their meals frequently enough; 33% have enough food variety for nutrition, and 21% get overall adequate meals.

India's Midday Meal Scheme has been a major success for school-age children, which provides a daily hot healthy meal to 100 million children. Current trends in the program are adapting the meals based on research to meet more specific nutrition needs.

Since the 1970s, India has had programs to prevent vitamin A deficiency, but this problem is much less nowadays. Vitamin D deficiency is a challenge that the government is addressing with food fortification.

Poverty

Children in poverty experience health problems which children in families with more money will not have. In general, any sort of health problem is worse for someone without immediate access to healthcare. Medical problems which have poverty as a cause include issues in oral health. Kerala organized poverty reduction programs and, after that, had better children's health. Various commentators have examined the Kerala model as an example of what might work elsewhere in India.

Environmental health

Children in India are significantly affected by environmental health problems. Challenges such as air pollution, water pollution, health effects of pesticides, and sanitation require government-level planning to fix and are challenging to address.

Urbanisation in India has been increasing more quickly than many cities can develop. There is a great disparity in access to healthcare within cities, depending on the money a person has.

Vaccination

Of all countries, India has the highest number of deaths of children under age five. Most of these deaths are from vaccine-preventable diseases. If children in India got vaccines, then their health and lives would be improved.

Ideally, all children would get their vaccinations on time. The BCG vaccine against tuberculosis and leprosy 31% of children get it on time, and 87% get it by age 5. For DPT vaccine against diphtheria, pertussis, and tetanus, 19% get it on time and 63% by age 5. For the meningococcal vaccine against meningococcal disease, 34% get it on time, and 76% get it by age 5.

Children in slums more often lack vaccine protection.

Other societal issues
Various difficult and social issues are related to child development in India. Poverty presents particular challenges for street children in India, child workers in India, and children trafficked in India. Children's health matters related to gender include gender inequality in India, female infanticide in India, and certain aspects of child marriage in India.

Regional variation
A 2012 nutrition study in Maharashtra found that household and family access to food was less of a problem, but having a variety of nutritious food was a challenge to address.

A report on Haryana recommended access to cleaner-burning fuel to improve children's health through improved household aid quality.

Society and culture
A 2017 study reported that India's government has policy and delivery systems that are favorable for achieving improvements in child nutrition. The challenges are financing such social programs, researching to keep them on track, and urban capacity to grow programs.

Private sector impact
The efforts of several privately funded organizations, including the Aga Khan Foundation, have positively impacted ECD in India.

References

Child development
Childhood in India
Children's health in India